Kumaka is a community in Barima-Waini region, in northern Guyana. 

Kumaka is site of Kumaka District Hospital.  It adjoins the village of Santa Rosa, and is the business centre of the community.

References

External links 

 Map (Multimap.com)

Populated places in Barima-Waini